St. Joseph's Church is a historic Roman Catholic church at 17 W. Cochran Street in Middletown, New Castle County, Delaware.  It was built in 1883–84, and is a small rectangular frame building in the vernacular Gothic Revival style. It has a steeply pitched gable roof with projecting eaves, German siding, belfry, and a two-story rear wing, added between 1885 and 1900. It is currently known as the Holy Hill Worship Center.

It was listed on the National Register of Historic Places in 1978.

References

External links
Saint Joseph's Church website

Roman Catholic churches completed in 1884
19th-century Roman Catholic church buildings in the United States
Churches in the Roman Catholic Diocese of Wilmington
Carpenter Gothic church buildings in Delaware
Churches in New Castle County, Delaware
Churches on the National Register of Historic Places in Delaware
National Register of Historic Places in New Castle County, Delaware
Buildings and structures in Middletown, Delaware
1884 establishments in Delaware